Mount Alpenglow is a  landmark mountain located in the Kenai Mountains,  in the U.S. state of Alaska. Mount Alpenglow is the highest peak alongside Turnagain Arm, and although modest in elevation, relief is significant since the northern aspect of the mountain rises nearly a vertical mile in only one mile from the sea-level shores. The summit of Penguin Peak offers another good view of Alpenglow  directly across the arm.    

The mountain's name was officially adopted in 1969 by the United States Geological Survey. The mountain was so named since it often displays the post-sunset pink glow known as alpenglow for travelers on the Seward Highway and skiers at Alyeska Resort.

Climate

Based on the Köppen climate classification, Mount Alpenglow is located in a subarctic climate zone with long, cold, snowy winters, and mild summers. Temperatures can drop below −20 °C with wind chill factors below −30 °C. May and June are the best months for climbing in terms of catching favorable weather.

See also

List of mountain peaks of Alaska
Geography of Alaska

References

External links
 Local weather: NOAA Girdwood, AK
 Weather forecast: Mount Alpenglow

Alpenglow
Alpenglow
Alpenglow